This is a list of Furth mountains in Britain and Ireland by height. "outside" of) Scotland. They are also called Welsh Munros, Irish Munros, and English Munros respectively, or the three-thousanders, as in The Welsh 3000 challenge.

Some Furth definitions add a topographical prominence above , akin to a Scottish Murdo, however the official Scottish Mountaineering Club ("SMC") lists includes Furths with a prominence below this level. Applying the Real Munro definition to a Furth, requires a prominence above , akin to a Marilyn, and these 14 Furths are marked with (‡) in the tables below.

The SMC lists 34 Furths: six in England, 15 in Wales, and 13 on Ireland.

Climbers who complete all Munros, and the SMC list of 34 Furths, are called Furthists; the SMC keeps a register which numbered 631 Furthists at October 2018.  The first Furthist is registered as James A. Parker who completed all 34 Furths on the 19 April 1929 (having become a Munroist in 1927). In 1986 Ashley Cooper became the first person to climb all the 3,000 ft summits in one continuous expedition, of 111 days, 2,500 km, and 150 km of ascent.

Furth mountains by height
This list was downloaded from the Database of British and Irish Hills ("DoBIH") in October 2018, and are peaks the DoBIH marks as being Furths ("F").  The SMC updates their list of official Furths from time to time, and the DoBIH also updates their measurements as more detailed surveys are recorded, so these tables should not be amended or updated unless the entire DoBIH data is re-downloaded again.

Furth mountains by country
The following are a breakdown of Furths by country, and also marking the highest mountain classification grade by prominence (e.g. P600, Mayilyn, Hewitt etc.).

English Munros 

Welsh Munros

The 15 Welsh Furths (or Welsh Munros) are part of the Welsh 3000 Challenge.

Irish Munros 

There are 13 Furths in Ireland listed by the Scottish Mountaineering Club, which are also referred to as the Irish Munros.

DoBIH codes
The DoBIH uses the following codes for the various classifications of mountains and hills in the British Isles, which many of the above peaks also fall into:

suffixes:
=	twin

See also
List of mountains of the British Isles by height
List of mountains of the British Isles by prominence
Lists of mountains and hills in the British Isles
Lists of mountains in Ireland
List of Munro mountains in Scotland
List of Murdos (mountains)
List of Marilyns in the British Isles
List of P600 mountains in the British Isles

Note

References

External links
 Final Furths and Furthists

Furths